The Robinson Baronetcy, of Long Melford in the County of Suffolk, was created in the Baronetage of England on 26 January 1682 for Thomas Robinson. The title became extinct on the death of the third Baronet in 1743.

Robinson baronets, of Long Melford (1682)
Sir Thomas Robinson, 1st Baronet (–1683)
Sir Lumley Robinson, 2nd Baronet (c.1649–1684). He was buried in Westminster Abbey.
Sir Thomas Robinson, 3rd Baronet (1681–1743)

See also
 Robinson baronets

Notes

Extinct baronetcies in the Baronetage of England
1682 establishments in England